Eric Arthur Heiden (born June 14, 1958) is an American physician and a former long track speed skater, road cyclist and track cyclist. He won an unprecedented five individual gold medals, and set four Olympic records and one world record at the 1980 Winter Olympic Games. Heiden was the most successful athlete at those Olympic Games, single-handedly winning more gold medals than all nations except for the Soviet Union (10) and East Germany (9). He is the most successful Winter Olympian from a single edition of any Winter Olympics. He delivered the Athlete's Oath at those same 1980 Games.  His coach was Dianne Holum.

Heiden is an icon in the speed skating community. His victories are significant, as few speed skaters (and athletes in general) have won competitions in both sprint and long-distance events. Heiden is the only athlete in the history of speed skating to have won all five events in a single Olympic tournament and the only one to have won a gold medal in all events. He is considered by some to be the best overall speed skater (short and long distances) in the sport's history. Heiden ranked No. 46 in ESPN's SportsCentury 50 Greatest Athletes of the 20th Century in 1999, the only speed skater to make the list. In 2000, a Dutch newspaper called him the greatest skater ever.

Early life, education and family
Heiden was born in Madison, Wisconsin on June 14, 1958. His father, Jack Heiden, was a longtime orthopedic surgeon in Madison. His sister, Beth Heiden, also became an accomplished cyclist, speed skater and cross-country skier. In their hometown Shorewood Hills, Wisconsin (a suburb of Madison), Eric and his sister Beth were the driving forces behind the creation of the Heiden Haus, a small outpost where local children can warm up after skating or playing hockey on the ice rink (complete with underground clay platform). He graduated from Madison West High School in 1976.

After starting his undergraduate education at the University of Wisconsin–Madison, Heiden transferred to the University of California, San Diego and then to Stanford University in California, earning a B.S. degree in 1984 and an M.D. degree in 1991.

Athletic career

Speed skating
Heiden won the World Junior Speed Skating Championships in 1977 and 1978. During his short speed skating career, Heiden won three World Allround Championships and four World Sprint Championships, becoming the youngest athlete to do so. Three times he broke the world record in the 1000 metres, twice in the 3000 metres, and once each in the 1500 metres and 10000 metres. He also broke the points world record in both allround and the sprinting distances.

Heiden finished his speed skating career by finishing second behind Hilbert van der Duim at the 1980 World Allround Championships in Heerenveen. He stood at the top of the Adelskalender, a ranking system for long-track speed skating, for a record 1,495 days, and he won the Oscar Mathisen Award four times in a row from 1977 until 1980.

He received the 1980 James E. Sullivan Award as the top amateur athlete in the United States. In 1983, he was inducted into the United States Olympic Hall of Fame.

Heiden was elected to the Wisconsin Athletic Hall of Fame in 1990.

World records 

Over the course of Heiden's career he skated 15 world records:

Cycling
After his speed-skating career Heiden became a professional cyclist.

Track cycling
As a track cyclist Heiden competed at the 1981 UCI Track Cycling World Championships in Brno, but was not successful. He finished 19th and last in the men's individual pursuit event.

Road bicycle racing 
Heiden became a professional racing cyclist. He was one of the first cross-over athletes, becoming a founding member of the 7-Eleven Cycling Team. Together with his former speed skating coach (and ex-bike racer), Jim Ochowicz, he conceived of the idea of a European-style sponsored team for North American riders Heiden won a few American professional races. He finished the 1985 Giro d'Italia and took part in the 1986 Tour de France, although he did not complete the race, crashing on a downhill stretch and suffering a concussion five days from the finish.

Heiden is believed to have recorded one of the fastest times at 14:10 (1986 or 1987) on one of the local benchmark climbs in Woodside, California: Old La Honda Road. In 1985, Heiden won the first U.S. Professional Cycling Championship, becoming the American road race champion.

In 1999, Heiden was inducted into the United States Bicycling Hall of Fame.

Medical career 
Heiden completed medical school at Stanford University in 1991, and orthopedic residency training at University of California, Davis, in 1996, then spent a year at a sports medicine clinic in Birmingham, Alabama. He returned to California to practice as an orthopedic surgeon in Sacramento. At that time, he also served as team physician for the NBA's Sacramento Kings and the Sacramento Monarchs of the WNBA. In 2002, 2006, 2010 and 2014 he was team physician for the U.S. Olympic speed skating team. He opened a sports medicine-based practice at The Orthopedic Specialty Hospital (TOSH) in Murray, Utah and expanded Heiden Orthopaedics with an additional office in Park City, Utah.

In 2008, Heiden and Massimo Testa published Faster, Better, Stronger, a book about exercise science and exercise programs.

In 2009, Heiden was one of the team of doctors assisting U.S. speed skater J.R. Celski as the latter recovered from a very bad speed skating crash during the U.S. Olympic trials. Despite cutting himself to the bone and requiring 60 stitches, Celski was able to recover in time for the 2010 Winter Olympics in Vancouver, where he won the bronze medal in both men's 1500 m and 5000 m relay.

Personal life
Heiden met fellow medical student Karen Drews while the two were studying at Stanford, and they married in 1995. Karen is a hand surgeon. They have a daughter, Zoe, born in 2001.

Heiden was offered many sponsorship opportunities after his record-setting performance in the 1980 Winter Olympics, but turned down most of them, saying he had enough money, and preferred the anonymity.

A number of American former gold medal winners, including Heiden, were asked to participate in the ceremonies for the 2002 Winter Olympics held in Salt Lake City, Utah, but Heiden declined after he was passed over for the honor of lighting the Olympic torch.  The 1980 U.S. Hockey Team, which won the gold medal at the 1980 games, was given the honor instead. Heiden said in 2009: "I was probably just too stubborn. I figured if they don't appreciate what I did as a skater, if they don't appreciate now what I am doing as a human being, I'd just as soon hang out with my buddies and watch it. I did not mean to slight the Olympic hockey team in any way."

See also
List of multiple Olympic gold medalists at a single Games
List of Olympic medalist families

References

Further reading

 Wangrin, Mark (1999). "Eric Heiden: True Gold". In ESPN SportsCentury. New York: Hyperion-ESPN Books. pp. 252–3.

External links

 
 Eric Heiden at SpeedSkatingStats.com
 PB's and link Results International Championships Eric Heiden at Speedskatingbase.eu
 
 
 
 
 
 
 
 
 

 
 

 
 

 
 

1958 births
Living people
American male speed skaters
American male cyclists
American cycling road race champions
American orthopedic surgeons
American sports physicians
Olympic gold medalists for the United States in speed skating
Speed skaters at the 1976 Winter Olympics
Speed skaters at the 1980 Winter Olympics
Medalists at the 1980 Winter Olympics
World record setters in speed skating
James E. Sullivan Award recipients
Sportspeople from Madison, Wisconsin
University of Wisconsin–Madison alumni
Stanford University alumni
Stanford University School of Medicine alumni
Olympic Games broadcasters
World Allround Speed Skating Championships medalists
World Sprint Speed Skating Championships medalists
Oath takers at the Olympic Games
Madison West High School alumni
Cyclists from Wisconsin